Nihilism is a philosophical doctrine suggesting the negation of one or more putatively meaningful aspects of life. It has several forms:

Existential nihilism, the theory that life has no meaning
Mereological nihilism, disbelief in objects with proper parts
Metaphysical nihilism, the belief that there is a possible world in which there are no concrete objects at all
Epistemological nihilism, disbelief in knowledge
Moral nihilism, disbelief in objective moral facts
Political nihilism, the rejection of the necessity of fundamental social or political structures

Nihilism may also refer to:

Russian nihilist movement, a cultural and philosophical movement in Russia from the late 19th century
"Nihilism", a song by Rancid from their 1994 album Let's Go